Aneesa Ahmed is a Maldivian women's rights activist who was also the first speaker(vice) of People's Majilis from 2004 to 2009.

She studied as a Humphrey Fellow at Pennsylvania State University from 1985 to 1986. She later served as Deputy Minister of Women's Affairs in Maldives, where she brought up the subject of domestic violence although it was taboo to do so. After her service in government, she founded the non-governmental organization "Hope for Women" and led sessions about gender-based violence with police, students, and others. When the national radio of the Maldives began to feature religious scholars who claimed female genital mutilation was supported by Islam, she asked the government to intervene, and talked publicly about the harm caused by female genital mutilation.

She received a 2012 International Women of Courage award. She was the second Maldivian women to receive an International Women of Courage Award.

References

Living people
Maldivian activists
21st-century Maldivian women politicians
21st-century Maldivian politicians
Maldivian women's rights activists
Year of birth missing (living people)
Courage awards
Recipients of the International Women of Courage Award